Elias Music (formerly Elias Associates and later Elias Arts) is an American production music company founded in 1980 by brothers Jonathan Elias and Scott Elias.

The company specializes in audio branding, having developed some of the most recognizable jingles and sonic logos in advertising. Such audio includes the Liberty Mutual jingle, "We Are Farmers" for Farmers Insurance Group, the MTV moon landing station identification, and the Yahoo! yodel. In 2011, the company expanded to create the Elias Music Library under Jim Long.

In 2018, Elias Music was acquired by Universal Production Music.

References

External links 

Production music
Audio branding
Companies based in Santa Monica, California
Universal Music Group